Kalarivathukkal Bhagavathy Temple, Bhadrakali Shrine located near Valapattanam river, is the family shrine of Chirakkal Royal Family. The deity of the shrine is the fierce form of Bhadrakali. Kalarivathukkal Bhagavathy is considered as the mother of the ancient martial art Kalarippayattu and hence the name. The shrine is administered by Malabar Devaswom Board and classified as Category A Temple of the board. Kalarivathukkal has come from the word Kalari Vaatilkal.

Legend
The holy shrine is one of the Devi temple triads of the erstwhile Chirakkal Kingdom. The other two being Cherukunnu Annapoornashwari Temple and Tiruvarkadu Bhagavathy Temple(Madayi kavu). The mythology says that Annapoornashwari came from Kasi to Chirakkal in a boat along with Kalarivatukkalamma and Madayikkavilamma who were her mates; to see the Krishna Temple and never returned. 
The Chirakkal Kings were the successors of Kolathiris' who in-turn was the direct descendants of the Mooshika kings. Mooshika of North and Ay of South were the oldest dynasties of Kerala. The Ay dynasty eventually became extinct but the Mooshika was able to sustain. The later name of Mooshika Raja was changed toKolathirippad. The Kolathiris' relocated their capital from Ezhimala to Chirakkal near Valapattanam river.
The temple was once owned by Vadakke illam and was acquired by Chirakkal Kovilakom.

Temple Architecture
The temple is in traditional Kerala architecture style. The temple design is Rurujith Vidhanam(Kaula Shakteya Sampradaya) where in there are shrines of Shiva, Sapta Mathrukkal, Ganapathy, Veerabhadra and Kshetrapalakan(Bhairava) in 4 sanctums. The main deity is facing west. The shrine of Shiva is facing East, Shrine of Sapta Mathrukkal (Maathrushaala) facing North and the Shrine of Kshetrapalaka (Bhairava) facing East.
The Maathrushaala has idols of SapthaMathrukkal (Brahmani, Vaishnavi, Shankari, Kaumari, Varahi, Chamundi, Indrani), Veerabhadra and Ganapathi. Every morning after the rites the Sacred Sword is taken to the Mandapam adjacent to the Maathrushaala and taken back in the evening after the rites. 
The main idol is made of KaduSarkaraYogam so for performing rites and rituals a Archana bimbam of Devi is used for rites and ablutions.
The temple is opened throughout the year, in morning there will be Usha Pooja, at noon Pantheeradi Pooja and in evening Shakti Pooja

Theyyam
Theyyam is a religious ritualistic art-form conducted in Temples and Kavu in North Malabar. The shrine being the family deity of Kolathiri conducts the last Theyyam commencing the Theyyam period of a year. The huge Thirumudi of Kalarivathukkal Amma's theyyam is the one of the attractions of the festival.

Festivals
There are two major festivals are there in the shrine. Pooram festival in March–April for 9 days; starts in Karthika nakshatra and ends in Uthram nakshatra of the Malayalam Calendar month of Meenam. On the 7th day the idol is taken to Shri Siveshwaram Temple on 8th to Kadalai Shri Krishna Temple and on 9th it is taken back along with fireworks. The festival commences by the Kalarippayattu performance. Musical and traditional art performances such as Thayambaka, Poorakkali are performed. In June another festival Kalasham concludes the Theyyam period of a year. The other festivals are Navaratri, Shivarathri, Vishuvilakku, Perum kaliyattam in 10th Idavam and Niraputhari in karkkidakam.

See also
Rajarajeshwara Temple
Tiruvarkadu Bhagavathy Temple
Annapurneshwari Temple

References

External links

Hindu temples in Kannur district
Bhagavathi temples in Kerala